dar (disk archive) is a computer program, a command-line archiving tool intended as a replacement for tar in Unix-like operating systems.

Features 

 Support for slices, archives split over multiple files of a particular size
 Option of deleting files from the system which are removed in the archive
 Full backup
 Differential backup
 Incremental backup,
 Decremental backup
 Takes care of any type of inode (directory, plain files, symlinks, special devices, named pipes, sockets, doors, ...)
 Takes care of hard-linked inodes (hard-linked plain files, char devices, block devices, hard-linked symlinks)
 Takes care of sparse files
 Takes care of Linux file Extended Attributes,
 Takes care of Linux file ACL
 Takes care of Mac OS X file forks
 Takes care of some filesystem specific attributes like Birthdate of HFS+ filesystem and immutable, data-journaling, secure-deletion, no-tail-merging, undeletable, noatime attributes of ext2/3/4 filesystem.
 Per-file compression with gzip, bzip2, lzo, xz or lzma (as opposed to compressing the whole archive). An individual can choose not to compress already compressed files based on their filename suffix.
 Fast-extracting of files from anywhere in the archive
 Fast listing of archive contents through saving the catalogue of files in the archive
 Optional Blowfish, Twofish, AES, Serpent, Camellia encryption
 Optional public key encryption and signature (OpenPGP)
 Live filesystem backup: detects when a file has been modified while it was read for backup and can retry saving it up to a given maximum number of retries
 Hash file (MD5, SHA1 or SHA-512) generated on-fly for each slice, the resulting file is compatible with md5sum or sha1sum, to be able to quickly check each slice's integrity
 Filesystem independent: it may be used to restore a system to a partition of a different size and/or to a partition with a different filesystem

Frontends 
There are GUI frontends for dar called:
 Kdar for Linux, specifically KDE,
 DarGUI for Linux and Windows,
 gdar for Linux.
A text-mode browser/extractor: plugin for dar files in mc (Midnight Commander).

A scheduler / command-line frontend known as SaraB allows the Towers of Hanoi, Grandfather-Father-Son, or any custom backup rotation strategy, and modifications are available for PAR file support. Extended versions known as bzSaraB and baras are also available.

See also 

 List of file archivers
 List of archive formats
 Comparison of archive formats

References

External links 
 Homepage of dar

2002 software
Free data compression software
Free backup software